Marc Durant (born 14 June 1955) is a French former professional racing cyclist. He rode in five editions of the Tour de France and one edition of the Vuelta a España.

References

External links
 

1955 births
Living people
French male cyclists
Sportspeople from Creuse
Cyclists from Nouvelle-Aquitaine
20th-century French people